David Ross Beatty, C.M., OBE, MA, CFA (born 1942) is a Canadian businessman and academic. He serves as a Director of FirstService, Walter Energy and Canada Steamship Lines.  He is currently the Conway Director at the Rotman School of Management at the University of Toronto. Over his career he has served on over 35 Boards of directors and been Chair of 8 publicly traded companies.

Early life
Born in Toronto, Ontario, he was educated at Upper Canada College, the University of Trinity College (B.A. 1965) in Political Science and Economics, and Queens' College, Cambridge (M.A. 1967) in economics.

Career
Beatty is currently an adjunct professor at The Rotman School of Management at the University of Toronto and the Conway Director of the Clarkson Centre for Business Ethics and Board Effectiveness.

He has been a director of a variety of corporations including: Bank of Montreal, FirstService, Garbell Holdings Limited, Goldcorp, Inmet Mining, Thistle Mining, Canadian Securities Institute, Gardiner Group Capital, and Ivanhoé Cambridge Shopping Centres Limited.

Honours
He is a Member of the Order of Canada and an Officer of the Order of the British Empire. He is honorary Consul-General of Papua New Guinea. Past Chairman Upper Canada College, Toronto. Past Director of the Art Gallery of Ontario & The George R. Gardiner Museum of Ceramic Arts

References

1942 births
Living people
Alumni of Queens' College, Cambridge
Businesspeople from Toronto
Canadian Officers of the Order of the British Empire
Trinity College (Canada) alumni
University of Toronto alumni
Upper Canada College alumni
CFA charterholders
Members of the Order of Canada